The mahogany leaf miner (Phyllocnistis meliacella) is a moth of the family Gracillariidae. It is known from Costa Rica, but has recently also been recorded from Florida in the United States.

The larvae feed on Meliaceae species.

Phyllocnistis
Leaf miners